Verfeil is a commune in the Haute-Garonne department in southwestern France.

History
It was an important centre of Catharism from about 1140 to the mid 13th century. Bernard of Clairvaux preached against heresy at Verfeil in 1145. Sent away without a proper hearing by the seigneurs, he is said to have cursed the town with the words Viridefolium, desiccet te Deus! ("Verfeil, may God dry you up!") Izarn Neblat, one of those seigneurs, was said by Guillaume de Puylaurens to have lived in his old age in poverty at Toulouse as a result of this curse; the town's recovery was dated by the faithful to the period of the Albigensian Crusade, when Simon de Montfort, 5th Earl of Leicester gave it to bishop Foulques de Toulouse.

An important Catholic-Cathar debate was held at Verfeil in 1206. The Catholic side was led by Diego de Acebo, bishop of Osma, supported by the future Saint Dominic; among the Cathars were Pons Jourda and Arnaud Arrufat.

Population

Monuments

See also
Communes of the Haute-Garonne department

References

Communes of Haute-Garonne